Patrick Russill (born 9 September 1953) is an English choral conductor, organist and music conservatoire teacher.

He is currently Head of Choral Conducting at the Royal Academy of Music, London (since 1997), where he is also a professor of organ (since 1999), Director of Music of the London Oratory (since 1999), Visiting Professor of Choral Conducting at the Hochschule für Musik und Theater Leipzig (since 2001) and Chairman of The Church Music Society (since 2019). He was made a Professor of the University of London in 2022, and in 2023 he was awarded the Medal of the Royal College of Organists (its highest honour) in recognition of his distinguished achievement in choral conducting and pedagogy, and in church music.

Career 

Educated at Shaftesbury Grammar School, Dorset (1965–1972), he was organ scholar (1972–1975) at New College, Oxford, where he gained a first class honours degree in music. He studied organ with Nicholas Danby and at the age of 23 was appointed organist of the London Oratory in 1977 in succession to Ralph Downes. Between 1984 and 2003 he was also Director of the London Oratory Junior Choir. During this time the choir appeared at The Proms, at the Royal Opera House and participated in recordings of J.S. Bach's St Matthew Passion and Monteverdi's Vespers of 1610 on the DG Archiv label with Sir John Eliot Gardiner and the Monteverdi Choir.

Russill was appointed Head of Church Music by the Royal Academy of Music in 1987, in order to found Britain's first conservatoire church music department. In 1997 he was appointed Head of Choral Conducting at the academy, leading the UK's first specialist postgraduate choral conducting course. He has given choral conducting masterclasses for the Royal College of Organists, the Cathedral Organists' Association, the Assistant Cathedral Organists' Association, the Conference of Catholic Directors of Music, and the Music Masters' and Mistresses' Association. He has also been a guest professor at the conservatoires in Stockholm, Helsinki, Düsseldorf and Strasbourg.

He was appointed Director of Music at the London Oratory in 1999. With its professional Choir of the London Oratory he has recorded a number of CDs on the Herald label and broadcast on BBC Radio 3.

As an organ recitalist he has played at major venues in the UK including York Minster, Westminster Cathedral, St Alban's Abbey and Birmingham Town Hall, as well as in Europe and Asia.  He made his Royal Festival Hall organ recital debut in 1986. In 2007 he introduced the reconstructed Tudor organs of the Early English Organ Project to London's South Bank, in an acclaimed Queen Elizabeth Hall recital. He was Chief Examiner of the Royal College of Organists 2005–2017.

He has also been an organ consultant, most importantly (with Nicholas Thistlethwaite) for the rebuilding of the Harrison and Harrison organ at Ely Cathedral (1999–2001).

As a scholar he has published articles on subjects mainly focussing on the English and Catholic traditions - early Tudor liturgical organ music, Howells's Latin church music and Dupré's Vespers - as well as editing choral music by Sweelinck and Howells for Novello and the Church Music Society (published by Oxford University Press). He was Musical Editor of the Catholic Hymn Book (1998) and has contributed to the revised New Grove, The Cambridge Companion to the Organ (1998), and Geschichte der Kirchenmusik (Laaber-Verlag, 2011 and 2013).

In 2015, Russill was honoured by the Association of British Choral Directors with their annual Chair's Award for Choral Leadership.

Honours 
 Honorary Member of the Royal Academy of Music, London (Hon RAM), 1993
 Founding Patron, London Youth Choirs, 2012
 Medal of the Royal College of Organists, 2022

References 

Living people
1953 births
Honorary Members of the Royal Academy of Music
Alumni of New College, Oxford
English classical organists
Recipients of the Medal of the Royal College of Organists